Sam Tung Uk Resite Village of Sam Tung Uk Village (三棟屋村) is a village in Tsuen Wan District, Hong Kong.

Administration
Sam Tung Uk is a recognized village under the New Territories Small House Policy.

See also
 Sam Tung Uk Museum

References

External links

 Delineation of area of existing village Sam Tung Uk (Tsuen Wan) for election of resident representative (2019 to 2022) (Sam Tung Uk Resite Village)
 Pictures of Sam Tung Uk Resite Village

Villages in Tsuen Wan District, Hong Kong